Lea Jagodič (born February 12, 1991) is a Slovenian female professional basketball player.

External links
Profile at eurobasket.com

1991 births
Living people
Sportspeople from Celje
Slovenian women's basketball players
Small forwards
Power forwards (basketball)